is a Japanese electronics company headquartered in Ogaki, Gifu prefecture that manufactures electronics-related products, such as printed circuit boards and IC packaging. The company also makes ceramics products, including particulate filters for diesel engines, for which it has a 50% market share in Europe.

Ibiden was founded as an electrical power generation company in 1912. In the following decades the company diversified its operations and products, from power generation to electric furnace products (between 1917 and 1919), building materials (in 1960), printed circuit board (in 1972) and ceramic fibers (in 1974).

Today electronic components and ceramics are the company's main products, with customers including Apple Inc., Intel and Groupe PSA (PSA Peugeot Citroën).

References

External links
 Official global website 

Electronics companies of Japan
Mitsui
Capacitors
Companies listed on the Tokyo Stock Exchange
Companies based in Gifu Prefecture
Japanese companies established in 1912
Companies listed on the Nagoya Stock Exchange
Electronics companies established in 1912
Japanese brands
Ōgaki